Liquid cargo barges are barges that transport petrochemicals, such as styrene, benzene and methanol; liquid fertilizer, including anhydrous ammonia; refined products, including gasoline, diesel fuel, and jet fuel; black oil products, such as asphalt, No. 6 fuel oil and coker fuel; and pressurized products, such as liquefied petroleum gases and butadiene, which are transported on the waterways from producers to end users.

In Russia, Volgotanker operated a fleet of liquid cargo barges on the Volga River system until 2008.

References 

Barges